Lukáš Lacko was the defending champion but defeated in the Semifinals by Lukáš Rosol.
Rosol went on to win the title against Björn Phau 6–7(3–7), 7–6(7–5), 7–6(8–6) in the final.

Seeds

Draw

Finals

Top half

Bottom half

References
 Main Draw
 Qualifying Draw

Slovak Open - Singles
2012 Singles